A balloon is a flexible container for (partially or fully) confining a gas.

Balloon may also refer to:

Arts, entertainment, and media

Films
Balloon (2017 film), a Tamil film by Sinish starring Jai, Anjali, and Janani Iyer
Balloon (2018 film), a German film about the East German balloon escape
Balloon (2019 film), a Chinese film
Balloon (short film), a 2019 U.S. short film

Music

Artists
Balloon (band), English musical duo
Keina Suda, Japanese musician also known under the name Balloon

Songs
"Balloons" (song), by Foals, 2007
"Balloons", by TVXQ from "O"-Jung.Ban.Hap., 2006

Other arts, entertainment, and media
Balloon (game)
Balloon (Merse), an 1878 painting by Pál Szinyei Merse
Balloon, a TV ident for BBC Two from 1993 to 1997
BBC One 'Balloon' idents, better known as simply "Balloon", a series of television idents for BBC One from 1997 to 2002
Balloon, member of one of the classes of fairy chess pieces
Speech balloon, including thought balloon, scream balloon, etc.
Balloon Battle, a gameplay mode in Nintendo's Mario Kart series

Computing and technology
Balloon help, a help system introduced by Apple Computer in their 1991 release of System 7.0
Balloon, blown up short pin able to carry an indicating letter within as markers for positions on maps, as in Google Maps
 Balloon hashing, a key derivation function to compute hashes for passwords

Economics and finance
Balloon payment mortgage
Balloon, economic bubble

Transportation
Balloon loop, a track system to allow trains to reverse direction
English Electric Balloon tram, type of double-deck tramcar used in Blackpool, England

Other uses
Balloon (typeface)
Balloon effect, primarily in drug interdiction, where success against a problem in one place or form displaces it somewhere else
Construction technique of balloon framing
Snifter, sometimes called a brandy balloon
Trial balloon, action to covertly gauge public interest
Balloon, a troop from the mobile games Clash of Clans and Clash Royale

See also
Air balloon (disambiguation)
Ballon (disambiguation)
Ballooning (disambiguation)
Balun, an impedance converter
Blimp
Bloons
List of balloon uses, terms containing the word
Pig bladder
Pneumatic bladder